Christine Larsen (born December 15, 1967) is a Canadian competitor in synchronized swimming and Olympic medalist.

She competed for Canada and received a silver medal in synchronized team swimming at the 1996 Summer Olympics in Atlanta.

Larsen is the sister of sportscaster and fellow Olympian Karin Larsen, who covered Larsen's medal-winning performance for CBC News.

References

1967 births
Living people
Canadian synchronized swimmers
Olympic silver medalists for Canada
Olympic synchronized swimmers of Canada
Synchronized swimmers at the 1996 Summer Olympics
Olympic medalists in synchronized swimming
World Aquatics Championships medalists in synchronised swimming
Synchronized swimmers at the 1991 World Aquatics Championships
Medalists at the 1996 Summer Olympics
Commonwealth Games medallists in synchronised swimming
Commonwealth Games gold medallists for Canada
Commonwealth Games bronze medallists for Canada
Synchronised swimmers at the 1990 Commonwealth Games
20th-century Canadian women
21st-century Canadian women
Medallists at the 1990 Commonwealth Games